Bhola is a town and district headquarter of Bhola District in the division of Barishal, Bangladesh.

Administration Bhola sub-division was established under the Noakhali district in 1845. At that time its administrative center was at Amania of Daulatkhan. The sub-division was included in the Barisal district in 1869. The sub-division then consisted of Daulatkhan and Burhanuddin Hat Thanas and three outposts such as Taltali, Gazipur, and Tazumuddin. The sub-divisional headquarters was shifted from Daulatkhan to Bhola in 1876. It was elevated to a district on 1 February 1984.

References

Populated places in Bhola District
Towns in Bangladesh